Peacemakers are individuals and organizations involved in peacemaking, often in countries affected by war, violent conflict, and political instability.  They engage in processes such as negotiation, mediation, conciliation, and arbitration – drawing on international law and norms.  The objective is to move a violent conflict into non-violent dialogue, where differences are settled through conflict transformation processes or through the work of representative political institutions.

Peacemaking can occur at different levels, sometimes referred to as 'tracks'.  "High level" (governmental and international) peacemaking, involving direct talks between the leaders of conflicting parties, is sometimes thus referred to as Track 1.  Tracks 2 and 3 are said to involve dialogue at 'lower' levels—often unofficially between groups, parties, and stakeholders to a violent conflict—as well as efforts to avoid violence by addressing its causes and deleterious results. Peacemakers may be active in all three tracks, or in what is sometimes called multi-track diplomacy.

Selected peacemaking organizations 

Here is a selected list of prominent inter-governmental and non-governmental peacemaking organizations.

 Centre for Conflict Resolution (South Africa)
 Centre for Humanitarian Dialogue (Switzerland)
 Center for Nonviolent Communication (international)
 Christian Peacemaker Teams (roots in North America)
 Community of Sant'Egidio (Italy)
 Crisis Management Initiative (Finland)
 Intergovernmental Authority on Development (Djibouti)
 International Alert (United Kingdom)  
 Initiatives of Change
 Organization of African Unity (Ethiopia) 
 Responding to Conflict (United Kingdom) 
 American Friends Service Committee, an arm of the Quakers
 Quaker Peace & Social Witness (QPSW) the corresponding Quaker department in Britain
 John Woolman College of Active Peace 
 Reverend Sun Myung Moon of Universal Peace Federation
 Student Peacemakers  
 Search for Common Ground (United States) 
 swisspeace (Switzerland) 
 The United Nations
 Borderless World Foundation

See also
 List of peace activists

References

External links 
UN Peacemaker, United Nations

Diplomacy